Jens Mouris (born 12 March 1980) is a Dutch former professional racing cyclist.

Born in Amsterdam, Mouris represented the Netherlands at the 2000 Summer Olympics in Sydney where he took part in the  team pursuit together with John den Braber, Robert Slippens and Wilco Zuijderwijk. They ended up in seventh position after being lapped by Ukraine in the quarter finals. Four years later Mouris qualified for the same disciplines to participate in the 2004 Summer Olympics in Athens. This time the new team featuring Levi Heimans, Peter Schep and Jeroen Straathof came fifth.

Major results

1998
 2nd Points race, UCI Junior Track World Championships
1999
 1st Ronde van de Haarlemmermeer
2000
 1st Westfriese Dorpenomloop
 2nd Time trial, Dutch National Under-23 Road Championships
 3rd Kilo, Dutch National Track Championships
2001
 1st Joseph Sunde Memorial
 2nd Time trial, Dutch National Under-23 Road Championships
 2nd Ronde van Noord-Holland
2002
 1st Grote Rivierenprijs
 2nd Time trial, Australian National Under-23 Road Championships
 2nd Individual pursuit, Dutch National Track Championships
 3rd Overall Olympia's Tour
1st Prologue
2003
 7th Ronde van Noord-Holland
2004
 1st  Individual pursuit, Dutch National Track Championships
 1st Ronde van Overijssel
 1st Omloop van de Glazen Stad
 2004 UCI Track Cycling World Cup Classics
2nd Team pursuit, Manchester
2nd Team pursuit, Sydney
 2004–05 UCI Track Cycling World Cup Classics, Moscow
2nd Team pursuit
3rd Individual pursuit
2005
 2005–06 UCI Track Cycling World Cup Classics
1st Individual pursuit, Moscow
3rd Team pursuit, Manchester
 1st Prologue Ronde van Antwerpen
 2nd Team pursuit, UCI Track Cycling World Championships
2006
 1st  European Omnium Championships
 1st Madison, 2006–07 UCI Track Cycling World Cup Classics, Moscow (with Danny Stam)
 2nd Individual pursuit, UCI Track Cycling World Championships
 2005–06 UCI Track Cycling World Cup Classics, Carson
2nd Individual pursuit
2nd Madison (with Niki Terpstra)
2nd Team pursuit
 2nd Overall Tour du Brabant Wallon
1st Stages 2 & 3
 4th Neuseen Classics
 6th Vlaamse Havenpijl
 9th Ronde van Overijssel
2007
 UEC European Track Championships
1st  Madison (with Peter Schep)
3rd Omnium
 1st Madison, 2006–07 UCI Track Cycling World Cup Classics, Manchester (with Peter Schep)
 2007–08 UCI Track Cycling World Cup Classics
1st Madison, Sydney (with Peter Schep)
3rd Team pursuit, Beijing
 2nd Individual pursuit, Dutch National Track Championships
 9th Overall Driedaagse van West-Vlaanderen
2008
 2nd Individual pursuit, Dutch National Track Championships
 3rd Tallinn–Tartu GP
 4th Overall Tour de Picardie
 4th Overall Delta Tour Zeeland
1st Prologue
2009
 3rd Overall Driedaagse van West-Vlaanderen
 8th Ronde van het Groene Hart
2010
 1st Ronde van het Groene Hart
 3rd Ronde van Noord-Holland
 4th Duo Normand (with Lieuwe Westra)
 6th Overall Three Days of De Panne
 6th Overall Delta Tour Zeeland
2011
 2nd Time trial, Dutch National Road Championships
 3rd Duo Normand (with Martijn Keizer)
 6th Overall Driedaagse van West-Vlaanderen
2012
 1st Stage 1 (TTT) Tirreno–Adriatico
 1st Stage 2 (TTT) Eneco Tour
 3rd Team time trial, UCI Road World Championships
2013
 2nd Team time trial, UCI Road World Championships
 2nd Duo Normand (with Michael Hepburn)
2014
 2nd Team time trial, UCI Road World Championships

See also
 List of Dutch Olympic cyclists

References

External links

Mouris at the Dutch Olympic Archive

1980 births
Living people
Cyclists at the 2000 Summer Olympics
Cyclists at the 2004 Summer Olympics
Cyclists at the 2008 Summer Olympics
Olympic cyclists of the Netherlands
Dutch male cyclists
Cyclists from Amsterdam
UCI Road World Championships cyclists for the Netherlands
Dutch cyclists at the UCI Track Cycling World Championships
20th-century Dutch people
21st-century Dutch people